Pontes Ridge is a mountain spur that descends eastward to McCraw Glacier, 4 nautical miles (7 km) south of Derrick Peak in Britannia Range. Named in association with Britannia by a University of Waikato (N.Z.) geological party, 1978–79, led by Michael Selby. Pontes is a historical placename formerly used in Roman Britain.

External links 

 Pontes Ridge on USGS website
 Pontes Ridge on SCAR website
 Pontes Ridge area map

References  

Ridges of Oates Land